Dobbyn is a ghost town and former copper mine in the locality of Three Rivers, Shire of Cloncurry,  Queensland, Australia.

History 

Dobbyn was the railhead for the Mount Cuthbert and Dobbyn railway lines.

Dobbyn State School opened in 1918 and closed circa 1954.

References

Towns in Queensland
Shire of Cloncurry